Alfonsius Kelvan (born June 21, 1989) is an Indonesian footballer as a goalkeeper.

Career

2013
On 9 December 2013, he signed a one-year contract with Pelita Bandung Raya.

2016
In 2016, Alfonsius joined Persiba Balikpapan in the 2016 Indonesia Soccer Championship A.

2017
In 2017 he signed a one-year contract with Bali United F.C. for a match 2017 Liga 1.

References

External links

1989 births
Association football goalkeepers
Living people
People from Jakarta
Sportspeople from Jakarta
Indonesian Muslims
Converts to Islam
Indonesian former Christians
Indonesian footballers
Liga 1 (Indonesia) players
Liga 2 (Indonesia) players
Indonesian Premier Division players
Persepam Madura Utama players
Pelita Bandung Raya players
Persiba Balikpapan players
Bali United F.C. players
Persebaya Surabaya players
Borneo F.C. players
PSMS Medan players
Persela Lamongan players